Camp Firwood is a Christian summer camp situated on Lake Whatcom, southeast of Bellingham, Washington. It is part of "The Firs", a Christian camp and retreat ministry that is in good standing with the Christian Camp and Conference Association.

Overview

History
Camp Firwood was founded by Otis and Julia Whipple, who gathered 35 people for a five-day retreat at their property overlooking Lake Whatcom in July 1921. This was the start of what would become a multi-site, multi-program organization now called "The Firs". In 1954, a group of 30 Junior High campers paddling on Lake Whatcom landed on a camp site which they called "White Sands". With the permission of the property owner, the first week-long resident camp took place on this  property, which soon become known as Camp Firwood. In 1955, Camp Firwood was purchased for $35,000.

Today, Camp Firwood runs ten weeks of camp for youth 7–18 years of age, and houses up to 260 campers a week. The camp now encompasses  of beautiful forest,  of waterfront, and its own private island. They host day camps and resident camps, both of which are co-ed. In 2010, they opened a new  dining hall, dubbed the Centerhouse, to more adequately accommodate the growing number of campers.

Also in 2010, the camp finished in the Top 5 for "Best Fun Place for Kids in Western Washington" by King5's Evening Magazine.

In June 2019 Camp Firwood made the news for firing Jace Taylor as a counselor at Fircreek Day Camp for being gay. The decision was made after a camp leader came across Taylor's profile picture on Facebook which showed him with his boyfriend. The camp released a statement that corroborated Taylor's assertion that he had been fired on the basis of his sexuality saying, "It became evident in the hiring process that he did not personally align with our Doctrinal Statement (regarding sexuality in particular). In this case, in order to be consistent to our Mission and Doctrinal Statement, we unfortunately had to withdraw our invitation to this young man, who we truly like, for this summer staff role." Taylor had been a former camper, as well as his mother and her mother before her. This controversy led to The Opportunity Council terminating its more than 25-year-long kitchen lease with The Firs. The lease provided Opportunity Council with a fully equipped, commercially licensed kitchen, which would be used to provide meals for children in Head Start and Early Childhood Assistance and Education preschools throughout Whatcom County. The lease paralleled the school year, which complemented The Firs’ busiest schedule of meal production in late spring to early fall. Cancellations as of Friday, June 21, represent a loss of 4-7% of registrations.

Activities
Although its main attractions are at the waterfront, Camp Firwood also hosts a variety of other activities including paintball, arts and crafts, a 10-stage high ropes challenge course, a  climbing center, archery range, soccer field, basketball court,  skateboard ramps, and a beach volleyball court. Water activities include a swimming beach, two aqua jump trampolines, an aqua swing, kayaking, canoeing, sailing, waterskiing, wakeboarding, and tubing. They also have a "blob."

References

External links

Camp Firwood Centerhouse
Camp Firwood on YouTube
Christian Camp and Conference Association (CCCA)

Christian summer camps
Summer camps in Washington (state)